František Szobota (August 30, 1891 – January 10, 1939) was a Hungarian track and field athlete of Slovak descent in the 1912 Summer Olympics. He was born in Košice and committed suicide in Levoča.
In 1912 he was eliminated in the semifinals of the 100 metres competition. He was also a member of the Hungarian team which was eliminated in the semifinals of the 4x100 metre relay competition.

References

External links
Sports Reference
profile 

1891 births
1939 suicides
Sportspeople from Košice
Slovak male sprinters
Hungarian male sprinters
Olympic athletes of Hungary
Olympic athletes of Slovakia
Athletes (track and field) at the 1912 Summer Olympics
Suicides in Czechoslovakia